The New Zealand Chinese Students’ Association (NZCSA) is an incorporated student society that aims to serve Chinese students in New Zealand, promoting the Chinese Culture and act as a bridge between the Chinese student community and the local mainstream community.

The NZCSA has strong links to the United Front (China) a Chinese organisation described as having a strategy that involves numerous subservient fronts for the Chinese Communist Party. The 2016 President Naisi Chen, a current NZ Labour Party MP, refused to deny any links or funding sources, while also avoiding any and all public commentary on matters involving the persecution of the Uyghurs, and democratic issues within Hong Kong or the reunification of Taiwan.

History
Starting in 1996, the NZCSA began its life as a student initiative to connect Chinese students in New Zealand who shared the same vision, providing them with a chance to expand their capabilities as well as associate with like-minded young leaders.

Services
Since then, the NZCSA has become the largest Chinese student organisation while establishing itself as a reputable entity in the local business community. NZCSA sees around 800 new members each year and currently has a committee of 65 students. It holds over 4000 members in the member database as means of advertising to and bringing influence for its own values and business opportunities. NZCSA has a strong presence across multiple channels including Wechat, Sina Weibo, Facebook and Skykiwi forums.

The NZCSA hosts a range of events from Ski Trips to "Xue-Tang" Exam Tutorials. Its major annual events attract over 100 participants with advertisements covering the entire city campus of the University of Auckland (UoA), while it has co-operating business partners (around 60) and partnerships with Chinese student organisations in all major tertiary institutes. On top of the NZCSA's events, there are also joint events it holds with ASIA - an alliance of all Asian student organisations in the University of Auckland, such as the Grande Royale Ball and the Halloween Party. The NZCSA also has strong relationships with media companies and holds industrial and professional contacts with production companies.

Flagship Events

Welcome Party
A Welcome Party is held annually for NZCSA members at the beginning of the university semester. It's designed to help students, especially those that are new to the university, to get familiar with the new environment and make more friends. There is a different theme for the Welcome Party every year, but the major goal is to provide NZCSA members a relaxing and comfortable environment to enjoy and have fun.

Professional Networking
Professional Networking aims to provide students a perfect chance to engage with experienced professionals and have a clearer vision for their future career development. The event is made up of three major sections: Discussion Tables Night, which offers a chance for participants to practice interpersonal skills with NZCSA alumni and graduates; PN Evening, which includes a presentation section from experienced speakers and a networking section; and Speed Networking that provides students the opportunity to engage one-on-one with prospective employers.

DreamWorks
DreamWorks is the largest and most influential singing competition for Asian singers. This is a chance to stand under the spotlight and bath in the attention of the audience.

Constitution
The Constitution has been approved by the committee with an overall rate of 86.86 per cent of committee members on 5 May 2015, 71 committee members attended, 542 votes counted against 8 modules.

Structure
The Committee of NZCSA consists of 5 departments and 115 positions.

Presidium
The 2023 Presidium of NZCSA consists of 2 presidents.

Executive Group
The 2023 Executive Group of NZCSA consists of: 2 Co-Presidents, 2 Directors of Operations, 2 Directors of Business Development, 2 Directors of Human Resources, 2 Directors of Information Technology,1 Director of Secretary General, 1 Director of Director of Finance and 2 Directors of Marketing.

2023

2022

2021

2020

2019

2018

2017

2016

2015

2014

See also 

 Chinese Students and Scholars Association

References

Chinese Students' Association
Chinese-New Zealand culture
International education industry
Overseas Chinese organisations